James Collins "Jimmy" Green (February 24, 1921 – February 4, 2000) was an American politician who served as Speaker of the North Carolina House of Representatives (1975–1976) and as the 28th Lieutenant Governor of North Carolina (1977–1985).

Political career
Green served in the North Carolina House of Representatives from 1961 through 1976. He was elected lieutenant governor in 1976 after defeating Howard Nathaniel Lee in a Democratic primary runoff. He was sworn-in on January 8, 1977. In 1980, after a change to the Constitution of North Carolina, Green became the first Lt. Governor elected to a second term. He defeated fellow former House Speaker Carl J. Stewart, Jr. in the 1980 Democratic primary, and then went on to defeat Republican Bill Cobey in the general election.

Green was charged in 1983 with accepting a bribe from an undercover FBI agent, but he was acquitted. The next year, he ran for Governor of North Carolina but finished fifth in the Democratic primary behind Rufus Edmisten. Green then threw his support to the Republican nominee, Jim Martin, giving him critical backing among conservative Democrats in eastern North Carolina. Martin went on to win the election.

Later life and death
He was convicted of income tax fraud in 1997 and was sentenced to 33 months of house arrest. The scandal was in connection with a multimillion-dollar tobacco fraud scheme.

He died in Bladen County hospital at Elizabethtown, North Carolina on February 4, 2000.

References

External links
Mention at The Political Graveyard

1921 births
2000 deaths
American people convicted of tax crimes
American Presbyterians
Lieutenant Governors of North Carolina
People from Bladen County, North Carolina
People from Halifax County, Virginia
Speakers of the North Carolina House of Representatives
Democratic Party members of the North Carolina House of Representatives
20th-century American politicians
North Carolina politicians convicted of crimes